The year 1807 in archaeology involved some significant events.

Explorations

Excavations

Finds

Publications

Births 
 August 20 - Charles Roach Smith, British archaeologist; co-founder of the British Archaeological Association  (d. 1890)

Deaths 

Archaeology
Archaeology by year
Archaeology
Archaeology